Miha Rihtar (born 4 March 1981) is a Slovenian ski jumper. He competed in the large hill event at the 1998 Winter Olympics.

References

1981 births
Living people
Slovenian male ski jumpers
Olympic ski jumpers of Slovenia
Ski jumpers at the 1998 Winter Olympics
Skiers from Ljubljana